Pita (Pular: 𞤅𞤢𞥄𞤪𞤫 𞤆𞤭𞤼𞤢), is a town in the Fouta Djallon highlands of Guinea. It is the capital and largest urban center of the Pita Prefecture.

Location
Pita is located in the Pita Prefecture in the Mamou Region, in central Guinea.

Th geographical coordinates of the town are 11°03'16.0"N, 12°23'46.0"W (Latitude:11.054444; Longitude:-12.396111).

Overview
The town is known for its bakeries and for waterfalls including the Kinkon Falls and the Kambadaga Falls. Tourists often visit the town market on their journey to and/or from the mountains and/or the waterfalls.

Transport
A good national road (N5) leads north to the city of Labé, and then south, through Dalaba to Mamou City.

Electricity
In September 2019, the French civil engineering and construction company Eiffage International, presented the feasibility study for Pita Hydroelectric Power Station. This power station, with generation capacity of 40 megawatts is planned across the Fétoré River, near Pita, Guinea. Due to the seasonality of that river, plans are underway to build an associated solar power station to complement the seasonal hydroelectric dam.

Population
The national census of 31 December 1996 put the population of Pita (Pita-Centre) at 19,489 people. On 1 March 2014, the national census enumerated the population of Pita at 28,124 inhabitants.

Language
People in Pita usually speak the Pular language, a Fulani dialect that is spoken by 8.5 million people in Guinea's Fouta Djallon region and by communities in the neighboring countries of Senegal, Sierra Leone and Guinea-Bissau. A small number of Malians also speak Pular.

See also
 Sub-prefectures of Guinea

References

Notes

External links
 Subprefectures of Guinea

Sub-prefectures of the Mamou Region